Peter-John Steenkamp (born 3 January 1998) is a South African rugby union player for the  in Super Rugby, the  in the Currie Cup and the  in the Rugby Challenge. His regular position is lock or flank.

References

1998 births
Living people
Golden Lions players
Lions (United Rugby Championship) players
Rugby union locks
Rugby union players from Bellville, South Africa
South Africa Under-20 international rugby union players
South African rugby union players